Repo! The Genetic Opera is a 2008 American rock opera horror film directed by Darren Lynn Bousman. Based on the 2002 musical of the same name, written and composed by Darren Smith and Terrance Zdunich, the film stars Alexa Vega, Paul Sorvino, Anthony Stewart Head, Sarah Brightman, Paris Hilton, Bill Moseley, Nivek Ogre and Zdunich.

Repo! premiered at the Fantasia Film Festival in July 2008, followed by a very limited release on November 7, 2008, on seven screens in Pasadena, Chicago, Mobile, Charlotte, Kansas City, Toronto and Ottawa. While initially released to mixed reviews, it gained a cult following similar to The Rocky Horror Picture Show, managing even to fill theaters worldwide with costumed fans performing alongside the film.

Plot

By the year 2056, an epidemic of organ failures has devastated the planet and wiped out 99% of the human population. The megacorporation GeneCo provides organ transplants on a payment plan. Clients who miss payments are hunted down by Repo Men, skilled assassins who "repossess" the organs ("Genetic Repo Man"). The CEO of GeneCo, Rotti Largo, discovers he is terminally ill. Rotti's children Luigi, Pavi and Amber bicker over who will inherit GeneCo ("Mark It Up"), but Rotti believes none of them are worthy heirs and instead plans to give his fortune to 17-year-old Shilo Wallace, the daughter of his ex-fiancée Marni ("Things You See In A Graveyard").

Shilo has inherited a rare blood disease from Marni, which requires her to stay indoors, though she longs to see the outside world ("Infected"). Shilo's overprotective father Nathan believes he killed Marni with a treatment he created for her illness – in truth, a jealous Rotti secretly poisoned Marni's medicine and blackmailed Nathan, promising not to arrest him if he agreed to become GeneCo's head Repo Man, though he has led Shilo to believe he is a doctor ("Legal Assassin"). One night, Shilo secretly visits Marni's tomb and runs into the omniscient GraveRobber, who is digging up bodies to secrete Zydrate, a euphoric and addictive pain-killer that he sells on the street to keep up with his GeneCo payments ("21st Century Cure").

Rotti lures Shilo to GeneCo's fair with the promise of a cure for her disease. There, she meets Blind Mag, an opera singer and GeneCo's celebrity spokesperson. Born blind, Mag has been given surgically enhanced eyes by GeneCo at the cost of indefinite employment, though she is soon resigning. GraveRobber helps Shilo escape the fairgrounds, encountering several of his customers including the surgery-addicted Amber ("Zydrate Anatomy"). Amber explains that Mag's eyes are set for repossession and that she will replace her as GeneCo’s spokeswoman. After GeneCops arrive, Shilo quickly returns to her room before Nathan notices her missing.

Rotti hires Nathan to repossess Mag's eyes, but Nathan refuses, citing that Mag was Marni’s best friend ("Night Surgeon"). An infuriated Rotti vows to have Nathan taken out. Mag visits Shilo and reveals she is her godmother, and that Nathan had told her Shilo died with Marni. She cautions Shilo to not make the same mistakes she did ("Chase the Morning"). Nathan arrives and forces Mag out after she scolds him for lying and incarcerating Shilo ("Everyone’s a Composer"). Meanwhile, Rotti writes his will, ready to make Shilo his sole beneficiary ("Gold").

Rotti invites Shilo to the Opera ("At the Opera Tonight"). Nathan heads to the opera to find her, pursued by GeneCops who he quickly dispatches. Amber makes her stage debut but her performance is ruined when her transplanted face falls off. Mag completes her final performance, but deviates from the song's grand finale, denouncing the Largo family and gouging out her eyes in an act of defiance ("Chromaggia"). Rotti cuts the cords suspending Mag, impaling her on a fence, but assures the panicking audience that Mag's death was staged as part of the show.

Shilo is approached by a Repo Man  and attacks him with a shovel, revealing that he is Nathan. She angrily confronts Nathan for lying to her about his profession ("Let the Monster Rise"). Onstage, Rotti reveals that Shilo does not actually have a blood disease; Nathan has been poisoning her "medicine" in an attempt to keep her safe from the outside world after being unable to cope with the loss of Marni. As his disease rapidly worsens, Rotti offers Shilo GeneCo if she kills her father. When she refuses, Rotti uses the last of his strength to fatally shoot Nathan, and dies after disowning his children. After a tearful farewell to her father ("I Didn’t Know I’d Love You So Much"), Shilo leaves, deciding that her father's actions do not dictate her future ("Genetic Emancipation").

Shilo flees, leaving GeneCo with no legal heir. Amber inherits the company instead and auctions her fallen face to charity, which Pavi wins.

Cast
 Alexa Vega as Shilo Wallace, the primary protagonist; 17 years old, she is confined to her room due to the alleged blood disorder she inherited from her mother, and dreams of exploring the world outside of her bedroom, which she considers her prison. While she initially strives to obey her father's rules, later in the story, she becomes more and more assertive, attempting to earn her independence. Prior to the story she has often snuck out of her room at night to collect bugs, and shots of her room shows she has an impressive collection.
 Paul Sorvino as Rottissimo "Rotti" Largo, the film's main antagonist; the ailing founder and president of GeneCo, looking for a worthy heir as his terminal disease progresses. He is a powerful and driven man, having built his GeneCo empire from the ground up, and believes that material wealth is the only real driving force in the world. He is ashamed of his own children, and is the one responsible for Marni's death, shielding the truth from Nathan as revenge for "stealing" Marni from him.
 Anthony Stewart Head as Nathan Wallace, Shilo's father and a widower, who wrongly believes he was inadvertently responsible for Marni's death. Nathan doubles as the head Repo Man to repay Rotti for "fixing" the circumstances of Marni's death with the police. Nathan is a highly skilled assassin who often laments his late night duties, though he appears to have some sadistic tendencies as well.
 Sarah Brightman as Magdalene "Blind Mag" Defoe, Shilo's godmother and Marni's best friend. She was born blind, but was given surgically enhanced eyes by GeneCo in exchange for having to work as a GeneCo spokesperson for the rest of her life. She is marked for repossession and is set to deliver her final performance for the company.
 Paris Hilton as Carmela Largo/Amber Sweet, Rotti's only daughter and the youngest of the Largo children. She is a singer addicted to both surgery and Zydrate, which she obtains illegally from GraveRobber, occasionally in exchange for sex.
 Bill Moseley as Luigi Largo, Rotti's aggressive, homicidal eldest son. He wields a knife at all times, and is willing to stab others at the slightest provocation.
 Nivek Ogre as Pavi Largo, Rotti's middle child. Womanizing, narcissistic, vacuous and effeminate, he wears the skinned face of a woman as a mask over his own, which is heavily scarred. Due to the way his face is attached, he is able to change faces on a whim. He has an Italian accent (to conceal his speech impediment, according to Zdunich) and is almost always surrounded by women, usually Genterns (GeneCo's employees).
 Terrance Zdunich as GraveRobber, a peddler who obtains Zydrate from corpses and has connections to Amber, both sexually and as a dealer. He also seems to be Shilo's first and only friend. Mysterious and charismatic, he acts as the narrator of the post-apocalyptic world.
 Sarah Power as Marni Wallace, Nathan's late wife and Shilo's mother; she was engaged to Rotti until she left him for Nathan. A jealous Rotti poisoned her and framed Nathan for the crime.
 Nancy Long provided Marni's singing voice for "Chase the Morning".

Joan Jett makes a cameo appearance playing guitar during the song "Seventeen". Dean Armstrong, later seen in Saw 3D, appears as the victim during "Thankless Job". Co-writer Darren Smith appears during "We Started This Op'ra Shit" as the GeneCo band leader. Frequent Bousman collaborator J. LaRose appears during "Zydrate Support Network" as a GeneCo spokesman.

Music

The film's soundtrack was produced by Yoshiki from X Japan.

A 7-track demo CD dubbed the "Pre-Surgery Sampler", was released on July 24, 2008. A 22-track soundtrack was released on September 30. Songs do not appear in the same sequence on the CD as they do in the film. On February 20, 2009, an extended edition of the soundtrack was released online. The "Deluxe Edition" contains 38 tracks; and the song, "Zydrate Anatomy", was re-cut and used in its film version for this edition. Melora Creager of Rasputina plays cello on the soundtrack.

The Original Motion Picture Soundtrack was released September 30, 2008 and only available through Amazon and iTunes. A deluxe version of the soundtrack was released on February 17, 2009. All tracks from the previous release remain on the deluxe edition in the same order, with new tracks placed in between some tracks, including score pieces. The only track that appears on both albums that differs is "Zydrate Anatomy", where it is slightly longer on the deluxe edition.

In the film, the following songs are performed:

 "Genetic Repo Man" - GraveRobber
 "Things You See in a Graveyard" - Rotti
 "21st Century Cure" - GraveRobber, Shilo
 "Shilo Wakes" - Nathan, Shilo
 "Infected" - Shilo
 "Legal Assassin" - Nathan, Ghostly chorus
 "Lungs and Livers" - GeneCo Chorus
 "Mark It Up" - Genterns, Amber, Luigi, Pavi
 "Tao of Mag" - Mag
 "Things You See in a Graveyard" (reprise) - Rotti
 "Limo Ride" - Rotti and Shilo
 "Thankless Job" - Nathan
 "Tao of Mag" (reprise) - Mag
 "No Organs? No Problemo!" - GeneCo chorus
 "Largo's Little Helpers" - Child chorus
 "Genterns" - Genterns, Pavi
 "Luigi, Pavi, Amber Harass Mag" - Luigi, Mag, Amber, Pavi, Rotti
 "Seeing You Stirs Memories" - Rotti
 "Seeing You Stirs Memories (Reprise)" - Rotti, Mag
 "My, What Big Scissors You Have" - Shilo
 "Inopportune Telephone Call" - Nathan, Shilo
 "GraveRobber and Shilo Escape" - GraveRobber, Shilo
 "Zydrate Support Network" - Rotti, Reporter
 "Zydrate Anatomy" - GraveRobber, Shilo, Amber, Zydrate addicts
 "Disposal Crew" - Disposal crew
 "Who Ordered Pizza?" - Luigi, Pavi, Nathan, Rotti, Amber
 "Night Surgeon" - Nathan, Rotti, Henchgirls, Luigi, Pavi, Genterns
 "Chase the Morning" - Mag, Shilo, Marni
 "Everyone's a Composer" - Mag, Nathan, Shilo
 "Come Back!" - Nathan and Shilo
 "What Chance Has a 17 Year Old Girl" - Nathan, Shilo
 "Seventeen" - Shilo
 "Happiness Is Not a Warm Scalpel" - Amber, Rotti
 "Gold" - Rotti
 "Nathan Discovers Rotti's Plan" - Nathan, Shilo
 "Tonight We Are Betrayed" - Nathan
 "At the Opera Tonight" - Shilo, Mag, Nathan, Amber, GraveRobber, Rotti, Luigi, Pavi
 "Bloodbath!" - GraveRobber
 "We Started This Op'ra Shit!" - Bandleader, Luigi, Pavi, Rotti, GeneCo chorus
 "Interrogation Room Challenge" - Rotti
 "Blame Not My Cheeks" - Amber, GeneCo chorus
 "Chromaggia" - Mag
 "Pièce De Résistance" - Rotti
 "Let the Monster Rise" - Nathan, Shilo
 "Sawman's Lament" - Rotti, Luigi, Pavi, Shilo, Nathan
 "The Man Who Made You Sick" - Rotti, Shilo, Nathan
 "Cut the Ties" - Rotti, Luigi, Shilo, Pavi
 "Shilo Turns Against Rotti" - Shilo, Rotti, Nathan
 "I Didn't Know I'd Love You So Much" - Shilo, Nathan
 "Genetic Emancipation" - Shilo
 "Epitaph" - GraveRobber, Zydrate addicts
 "Repo Man" - Ogre (end credits)
 "VUK-R" - Violet UK (end credits)
 "Needle Through a Bug" - Shilo, Graverobber (end credits)
 "Bravi" - Mag, Pavi, Luigi, Rotti, Amber (end credits)
 "Aching Hour" - Sarah Brightman (end credits)

Cut songs

Bits and pieces of some of these songs were used in the film. Most of the songs' scenes were cut entirety (*).
 "Crucifixus" - Mag, Ghostly chorus (used as the screen closes in to GeneCo; instrumental version used in film)
 "Bravi!"* - Mag, Pavi, Luigi, Rotti, Amber (end credits, a commercial that would have been used before "Mark It Up"; heard briefly between "Infected" and Nathan's Story)
 "Tao of Mag" - Mag (a commercial starring Mag that promotes the Genetic Opera; heard briefly between "Mark It Up" and Rotti's Story)
 "Can't Get It Up if the Girl's Breathing?"* - Amber, GraveRobber (Amber telling GraveRobber that there are other ways to pay for Zydrate; would have succeeded "Housecall") (also a deleted scene on the Blu-ray release)
 "Come Up and Try My New Parts"* - Amber (Amber seduces GraveRobber to get out of paying for Zydrate; succeeds "Can't Get It Up"; the scene is available on the Blu-ray)
 "GraveRobber and Shilo Escape" - GraveRobber, Shilo, Amber (GraveRobber and Shilo escape from the Italian festival; alternate version used in film, Amber not included) (also a deleted scene on the Blu-ray release)
 "Buon Giorno"* - Rotti, Pavi, Luigi, Genterns (Genetic Opera greeting; would have come after "We Started This Op'ra Shit!"; the scene is available on the Blu-ray)
 "Rotti's Chapel Sermon"* - Rotti (the scene was reedited to make up "Interrogation Room Challenge"; succeeds "Buon Giorno")
 "Needle Through a Bug"* - GraveRobber, Shilo (deleted scene where Shilo must pass another of Rotti's tests; succeeded "Rotti's Chapel Sermon"; the scene is available on the Blu-ray) and plays in its entirety during credits
 "Aching Hour"* - Blind Mag (Mag sings about her imminent death during the Renaissance festival; plays in its entirety during credits)

Score tracks
Includes songs only heard as instrumentals and not parts of any deleted songs: (* = instrumental)
 "Depraved Heart Murder at Sanitarium Square"* (First song heard in the film)
 "The Prognosis"* (Heard right after "Crucifixus")
 "Nathan's Story"* (Heard right after "Infected")
 "Rotti's Story"* (Heard right after "Tao of Mag")
 "A Ventriloquist's Mess"* (Heard right after "Thankless Job")
 "Blind Mag's Story"* (Heard right after "Seeing Your Stirs Memories")
 "Before the Escape"* (Heard right after "Inopportune Telephone Call")
 "Worthy Heirs?"* (Heard right after "Zydrate Support Network")
 "A Dump Truck Home"* (Heard right after "Disposal Crew")
 "The Visitor"* (Heard right after "Night Surgeon")
 "Pre-Happiness"* (Heard right after "Seventeen")
 "Not Your Parents' Opera"* (Heard right after "Bloodbath!")
 "Mag's Fall"* (Heard right after "Chromaggia")
 "A Ten Second Opera"* (Heard right after "Let the Monster Rise")

Production

Development
In 1996, Darren Smith had a friend who was going through bankruptcy and whose possessions were going into foreclosure. Inspired by this, Smith came up with the idea of a future where not only one's property, but also one's body parts, could be repossessed. Smith and Terrance Zdunich collaborated ideas and plot lines to create the first version of Repo!, titled The Necromerchant's Debt, which told the story of a Graverobber in debt to a Repo Organ Man. It premiered at the John Raitt theater in 2002. After being such a success, Smith and Zdunich expanded on the universe to create all of the storylines that became Repo! The Genetic Opera later in 2002. Many changes were made, gradually, to the characters and music throughout various incarnations through 2005. For example, Rotti, in the earliest performances, was not father to Luigi, Pavi and Amber. Instead, he was a younger brother to Luigi and Pavi, while Amber was Luigi's daughter. Lyrics were adjusted to new arcs and some songs were dropped altogether, such as "But This Is Opera!", cut out in an effort to change the direction of Mag's character.

After years of being performed as a stage play, Repo! was adapted into a ten-minute short film directed and financed by Darren Lynn Bousman to pitch the idea to film studios. The film starred Shawnee Smith as Amber Sweet (then named "Heather Sweet"), Michael Rooker as the Repo Man, Kristen Fairlie as Shilo, Zdunich as GraveRobber and J. Larose as Pavi.

Filming
Once picked up by Lionsgate, principal photography began in September 2007 in Canada. The film was scheduled to be released on April 25, 2008, but was pushed back to November 7. X Japan leader Yoshiki produced the soundtrack, along with composing one extra track for the film. He also served as the music director and one of the film's executive producers. Paul Masse was the cast's vocal coach for the film's soundtrack.

Distribution

Promotion
Due to lack of promotion, director Bousman and creator Zdunich did much of their own promotion. To coincide with the release, Bousman, Smith and Zdunich, as well as various cast members, did a Repo! Road Tour. The tour was set up for one-night screenings in seven different United States cities. Principal cast and crew also did extensive Q&A sessions following each screening. Because of strong ticket sales, a second and third touring session were added, in addition to a British tour across four locations. A Repo! Road Show was announced on January 28 in ten cities. This was similar to the Repo! Road Tour, except it was almost completely fan-run.

Theatrical release
The film received a limited release in the United States and Canada on November 7, 2008. It had a further limited Canadian release, playing in Toronto from November 21–27, 2008. It was released in the Czech Republic on November 20, this was followed by a theatrical release in Spain on January 2, 2009. In December 2008, several more US theatrical screenings were announced running between January 13–24, 2009 in several cities The Repo! Road Tour made its 4th and final leg in Europe from March 7–12, 2009.

After initial theatrical release and DVD sales, fan support has caused Repo! The Genetic Opera to be played in select theaters for the duration of 2009 and well into 2014, some with "shadow casts" in which a group of actors and performers re-enact the film in front of the big screen while the film is playing on stage, much like the followers of The Rocky Horror Picture Show. It was re-released in a special screening at the 2010 San Diego Comic-Con International.

Home media
The film was released January 20, 2009 on DVD and Blu-ray in the United States. In Canada, the DVD was released on January 20, 2009, and the Blu-ray was released February 10, 2009. It was released on DVD and Blu-ray in the United Kingdom on March 9, 2009. It was released in Ireland on March 6, 2009. The DVD was released in Germany on April 14. The US DVD release contains two audio commentaries (one by Bousman and actors Vega, Moseley and Ogre; the other by Bousman, creators Smith and Zdunich, and music producer Joseph Bishara), two featurettes and the theatrical trailer. The Blu-ray contains all DVD features including a select-scene audio commentary by Bousman and Hilton, two additional featurettes, a video sing-along with bouncing heart, four deleted scenes and the theatrical trailer.

Reception

Critical response
The film received generally mixed to negative reviews. Critics polled on the review aggregator website Rotten Tomatoes gave the film a 37% approval rating. The site's consensus reads, "Bombastic and intentionally gross, Repo! The Genetic Opera has a unique style but lacks the wit and substance to be involving". The film has a 32 out of 100 rating on Metacritic, indicating "generally unfavorable reviews". Kyle Smith of The New York Post concluded, "There probably aren't enough futuristic Goth rock musicals, but Repo! The Genetic Opera is weak on a couple of things a musical needs: music and lyrics." Nathan Lee for The New York Times declared the film "feels destined to please a campy coterie of fans and no one else" and criticized the music, saying, "A few catchy melodies, some clever lyrics or even a sense that the score wasn’t just one long, unmodulated track might have energized this singularly inert tale..." Tasha Robinson  for The A.V. Club said, "One of the main issues with Repo! The Genetic Opera is that nearly every aspect of it goes on too long. The songs are generally overextended, which is a particular problem given that most of them are also atonal and dull, either chanted or seemingly assembled from a series of clunky, ill-fitting, barely rhyming lines." And ultimately "...I spent the vast majority of the film either bored or squirming with discomfort over the cheap gore, the arrhythmic songs, and the phenomenally bombastic performances..."

The film has since developed a cult following since its original release in 2008.

Box office
Repo! grossed $53,684 in its opening weekend, a $6,711 average per theater. The film's full eleven-theater release earned $146,750 in the United States, and an additional $41,376 internationally, for a total of $188,126 worldwide.

Accolades
Hilton's performance won her the Golden Raspberry Award for Worst Supporting Actress at the 29th Golden Raspberry Awards. At the same ceremony, Hilton was also awarded Worst Actress for her role in The Hottie and the Nottie. The songs "Chase the Morning", "Chromaggia" and "Zydrate Anatomy" were shortlisted for the Academy Award for Best Original Song, although none were nominated.

Future
In regards to the possibility of a sequel, Vega has been quoted as saying: "From the very, very beginning, we always talked about a prequel or a sequel to this film. And it's hard, because as of right now, we all want to do it, but, you know, it didn't really do as we hoped. We didn't really have a lot of support. But we're hoping that the fans will come back, and it will be an underground cult classic that will grow, and that will eventually spark us to do another." Bousman also indicated interest, stating; "I would love to follow up Repo and finish the story, because it was conceived as a three-part movie. But this movie is all about support from the internet, and support from fans. This is not a movie where you'll see billboards or bus stop ads or trailers on TV." It was additionally expected that Hilton would return in her role as Amber Sweet.

However, in a video posted on YouTube, it was revealed that they "no longer control the answer to the question [of a future sequel]" since they no longer have ownership of the franchise, thus driving Bousman and Zdunich to make The Devil's Carnival.

See also
 Elysium
 Repo Men – A film involving a similar plotline regarding the repossession of transplanted organs

References

External links
 
 
 
 

2000s American films
2000s musical films
2000s English-language films
2008 horror films
2008 science fiction films
American dystopian films
American horror films
American musical films
American post-apocalyptic films
American satirical films
American science fiction films
American splatter films
Biopunk films
Circus films
Fiction set in 2056
Films about organ transplantation
Films based on musicals
Films directed by Darren Lynn Bousman
Films set in 2056
Films shot in Toronto
Golden Raspberry Award winning films
Goth subculture
Gothic horror films
Lionsgate films
Rock operas
Science fiction musical films
Sung-through musical films